The Kansas City Club Building is a 15-story building in downtown Kansas City, Missouri, built in 1920. It has been listed on the National Register of Historic Places since 2002.

The building was built as the clubhouse of the Kansas City Club, a private club. It remained the club's clubhouse until 2001, when the club merged with a nearby smaller club. In 2002, a developer bought and renovated the building. The first six floors were a banquet facility called "The Clubhouse on Baltimore." The remaining nine floors were converted to loft apartments called "The Clubhouse Lofts."

In 2020 it was converted to the Hotel Kansas City.

References

External links
 Hotel Kansas City official website

Clubhouses on the National Register of Historic Places in Missouri
Gothic Revival architecture in Missouri
Buildings and structures completed in 1920
Buildings and structures in Kansas City, Missouri
National Register of Historic Places in Kansas City, Missouri
Hotels established in 2020